Madna is a town and commune in Algeria.

Madna may also refer to:

 Madna, Karnataka, a village in Sedam Taluk, Karnataka, India
 Madna, West Bengal, a census town in West Bengal, India
 Madna Airfield, a World War II airfield in Italy
 Talemzane crater also known as Madna